USS LST-920 was an  in the United States Navy. Like many of her class, she was not named and is properly referred to by her hull designation.

Construction
LST-920 was laid down on 26 April 1944, at Hingham, Massachusetts, by the Bethlehem-Hingham Shipyard; launched on 29 May 1944;  and commissioned on 17 June 1944.

Service history
During World War II, LST-920 was first assigned to the European Theatre, sailing in convoy HXM 30. She was later reassigned to the Asiatic-Pacific theater and took part in the assault and occupation of Okinawa Gunto in June 1945.

Following the war, she performed occupation duty and saw service in China until early March 1946. Upon her return to the United States, she was decommissioned on 8 July 1946, and struck from the Navy list on 14 March 1947. On 17 June 1948, the ship was sold to Standard Oil of Indiana, for commercial operation, she was renamed Stanolind 55. In 1951, she was sold to Empreza Internacional de Transportes of Brazil.

Brazilian service
In Brazilian service, LST-920 was renamed Guarape. She was modified at Higgins, in New Orleans, Louisiana, for cargo handling. Four hatches were added to the main deck and four derricks. She was later sold to Companhia Paulista de Commercio Maritimo, of Santos, Brazil, where she retained her name. She was finally scrapped 23 June 1972.

Awards
LST-920 earned one battle stars for World War II service.

Notes

Citations

Bibliography 

Online resources

External links
 

 

LST-542-class tank landing ships
World War II amphibious warfare vessels of the United States
Ships built in Hingham, Massachusetts
1944 ships
Ships transferred from the United States Navy to the Brazilian Navy